Southwest Wisconsin Technical College (also Southwest Tech) is a technical college in Fennimore, Wisconsin. The college's district includes the area covered by 30 school districts, including all of Crawford, Grant, Iowa, Lafayette and Richland counties. It also includes parts of Dane, Green, Sauk and Vernon counties. It is a member of the Wisconsin Technical College System. The campus is on U.S. Highway 18.

History
The school became operational on July 1, 1967. It was created by Chapter 292, Laws of Wisconsin of 1965. The first program at the college was Farm Training.

Accreditations and memberships
Higher Learning Commission
Wisconsin Educational Approval Board
National League for Nursing Accreditation Commission
National Automotive Technician Foundation Automotive Service Excellence (ASE)
Commission on Accreditation of Allied Health Education Programs

References

External links
Official website

Wisconsin technical colleges
Educational institutions established in 1967
Education in Grant County, Wisconsin
1967 establishments in Wisconsin